Carola Unterberger-Probst (born 1978), aka [cup] or Carola Unterberger, is an Austrian media artist and philosopher of art. In addition to video installations and experimental films, her work contains Objet d'art, paintings and digital art. She specializes in  the postmodern discourse, deconstruction, and questions on media and the arts.

In 2009 she published a book, "Der Filmische Hypertext: Links im Film - Film als Link".

References

External links

1978 births
Living people
Artists from Salzburg
21st-century Austrian women artists
Austrian contemporary artists
Postmodern artists